

Denmark
South Greenland – Carl Peter Holbøll, Inspector of South Greenland (1828–1856)

Portugal
Angola – 
 José Xavier Bressane Leite, Governor-General of Angola (1842–1843)
 Temporarily vacant (1843–1844)

United Kingdom
 Malta Colony
Henry Bouverie, Governor of Malta (1836–1843)
Patrick Stuart, Governor of Malta (1843–1847)
 New South Wales – Major George Gipps, Governor of New South Wales (1838–1846)
 South Australia – Sir George Grey, Governor of South Australia (1841–1845)
 Western Australia – John Hutt, Governor of Western Australia (1839–1846)

Colonial governors
Colonial governors
1843